Hans Vosseler (born 1949) is a German swimmer and Olympic medalist. He was born in Paderborn in Nordrhein-Westfalen. He participated at the 1972 Summer Olympics, winning a silver medal in 4 x 200 metre freestyle relay.

References

1949 births
Living people
Sportspeople from Paderborn
German male swimmers
Olympic swimmers of West Germany
Olympic silver medalists for West Germany
Swimmers at the 1972 Summer Olympics
German male freestyle swimmers
Olympic silver medalists in swimming
Medalists at the 1972 Summer Olympics